Vinko Jelić (1596 - after 22 July 1636; also Vincenz) was a Croatian-born baroque composer, singer and musician.
He was born in Rijeka ("Fiume") and later studied in Graz.

Works
Parnassia militia concertuum unius, duarum, trium et quatuor vocum tam nativis quam instrumentalibus vocibus ad organum concinendarum, op. 1. Argentinae, Typis Pauli Ledertz, 1622.
Arion primus sacrorum concertuum unius, duarum, trium et quatuor vocum ad organum concinendarum, op. 2. Augustae Tribocorum, Apud Paulum Ledertz, 1628.
Arion secundus psalmorum vespertinorum tam de tempore, quam de Beata Maria Virgine quatuor vocibus, alternatim ad organum concinendarum adiunctis Magnificat, Salve regina, & octo tonis ad omnia strumenta accomodatis, op. 3. Augustae Tribocorum, Apud Paulum Ledertz, 1628.

References

External links
http://hbl.lzmk.hr/clanak.aspx?id=141

Croatian Baroque composers
Croatian musicians
Renaissance composers
16th-century Croatian people
17th-century Croatian people
1596 births
1630s deaths
17th-century classical composers
Male classical composers
17th-century male musicians